The Honda Crider is a compact sedan produced by Guangqi Honda in China. It was introduced in 2013.

The production first generation Honda Crider is an evolution of the Honda Concept C from Beijing Auto Show in 2012, and the production Honda Crider went on sale in from June 2013 produced by GAC-Honda. The Crider is designed to fill the gap between the City and Civic and sold exclusively in China, and was built on an extended version of the Honda City platform. Like all the other Honda products sold in China, the twin model called the Honda Envix produced by the Dongfeng-Honda joint venture was available from 2019, sharing the platform with the second generation Crider.



First generation (2013) 

The first-generation Crider was launched in June 2013. It is based on a stretched City body architecture.

The first-generation Crider is equipped with a 1.8-litre i-VTEC four-cylinder engine shared with the Honda Civic. It has an independent MacPherson strut front suspension and a single torsion beam rear suspension. All models feature four-wheel disc brakes and electric power steering.

Second generation (2018) 

The second-generation Crider was launched in September 2018.

The facelifted second-generation Crider was launched in September 2021.

Honda Envix
A rebadged version called Honda Envix is sold by Dongfeng Honda from 2019. The Honda Envix has a different front grille design and more aggressive bumpers. Different alloy wheels and an inverted license plate indentation is also featured to differentiate from the Crider. The interior design of the Envix is the same as the Crider with the upholstery used in both cars being different.

Transmission is a 6-speed manual transmission or a continuously variable transmission.

References

External links 

  (Crider)
  (Envix)

Crider
Cars introduced in 2013
2020s cars
Compact cars
Sedans
Front-wheel-drive vehicles
Vehicles with CVT transmission
Cars of China